The 1949 Lower Hutt mayoral by-election was held to elect a successor to Ernst Peterson Hay who resigned as Mayor of Lower Hutt upon his appointment as a judge of the Supreme Court. The polling was conducted using the standard first-past-the-post electoral method.

Background
Mayor Ernst Peterson Hay had been appointed as a Judge of the Supreme Court of New Zealand and after joining the judiciary he resigned as mayor on 20 January 1949 triggering a by-election. Citizens' Association councillor, and deputy mayor since 1947, William Gregory was elected to replace Hay, opposed only by councillor Henry Valentine "Harry" Horlor of the Labour Party, who had contested the mayoralty once before in 1941.

Results

Results by locality
Following table shows the detailed ballot results by the local polling booths:

Gregory was sworn in as mayor on 14 March at the first council meeting after the election. His first act was to nominate a successor to himself as deputy mayor. He nominated Eric Rothwell while Horlor nominated councillor Bella Logie, arguing that the role of deputy should go to a councillor of widespread appeal citing that Logie had polled third highest at the previous council election while Rothwell had polled eighth. Gregory disagreed and was disappointed that the council would not acclaim his nomination unanimously. A secret ballot was conducted by council members which resulted in a tie. Gregory used his casting vote for Rothwell.

Council by-election
As Gregory was a councillor at the time of his election he had to resign his council seat upon being sworn in as mayor at the first council meeting after the election. This triggered a second by-election for one council seat. The chairman of the Citizens' Association, Charles Hain, wrote to the Hutt Labour Representation Committee with a proposal to settle together on a suitable candidate and avoid a further election. After receiving no reply after 11 days the Citizens' Association nominated former councillor Herbert Frederick Muir for the vacancy. The Labour Party nominated Wellington Education Board and Petone and Lower Hutt Gas Board member James McDonald, who had stood for the city council in 1944, as its candidate.

The following table gives the election results:

Notes

References

Mayoral elections in Lower Hutt
1949 elections in New Zealand
Politics of the Wellington Region
March 1949 events